Roger Frederick Wicker (born July 5, 1951) is an American attorney and politician serving as the senior United States senator from Mississippi, in office since 2007. A member of the Republican Party, Wicker previously served as a member of the United States House of Representatives and the Mississippi State Senate.

Born in Pontotoc, Mississippi, Wicker is a graduate of the University of Mississippi and the University of Mississippi School of Law. He was an officer in the United States Air Force from 1976 to 1980 and a member of the United States Air Force Reserves from 1980 to 2003. During the 1980s, he worked as a political counselor to then-Congressman Trent Lott on the House Rules Committee. In 1987, Wicker was elected to the Mississippi State Senate, representing the 6th district, which included Tupelo.

Wicker was elected to the U.S. House of Representatives in 1994, succeeding longtime Representative Jamie Whitten. Wicker served in the House from 1995 to 2007, when he was appointed to the Senate by Governor Haley Barbour to fill the seat vacated by Lott. Wicker subsequently won a special election for the remainder of the term in 2008 and was reelected to a full term in 2012. Wicker served as chair of the National Republican Senatorial Committee from 2015 to 2017 and is a deputy Republican whip. He was reelected in 2018, defeating Democratic nominee David Baria.

Early life and education
Wicker was born on July 5, 1951, in Pontotoc, Mississippi, the son of Wordna Glen (née Threadgill) and Thomas Frederick Wicker. He earned a bachelor's degree in journalism and political science and a J.D. degree from the University of Mississippi, where he was a member of the Sigma Nu fraternity and student body president. He was inducted into Omicron Delta Kappa for his student leadership and academic merit while at the University of Mississippi.

After graduation, Wicker served as an officer in the United States Air Force from 1976 to 1980. Starting in 1980, he was a member of the Air Force Reserve; he retired from the reserve in 2003 as a lieutenant colonel. Wicker served as a judge advocate.

Early political career

Wicker began his political career in 1980 as House Rules Committee counsel to U.S. Representative Trent Lott. He was elected to the Mississippi State Senate in 1987, spending $25,000 on the race. He represented the 6th district, which included Tupelo, from 1988 to 1994. He amended a 1994 state Medicaid bill to authorize the Mississippi Attorney General to contract private attorneys on contingency.

U.S. House of Representatives

Elections
In 1994, Whitten declined to seek reelection; he had represented the 1st District for 53 years, longer than any other congressman at the time. Wicker ran to succeed him, spending $750,000 on his campaign. He finished first in a crowded six-way Republican primary with 7,156 votes (26.62%) and proceeded to a runoff with attorney Grant Fox, who received 5,208 votes (19.37%). Former U.S. Attorney Bob Whitwell finished 600 votes short of the runoff with 4,606 votes (17.14%), 1992 nominee Clyde E. Whitaker came fourth with 4,602 votes (17.12%), 1986 nominee Larry Cobb came fifth with 4,162 votes (15.48%) and 1990 nominee Bill Bowlin took the remaining 1,147 votes (4.27%). In the runoff, Wicker defeated Fox, 11,905 votes (53.07%) to 10,527 (46.93%).

In the general election, Wicker defeated Fulton attorney Bill Wheeler, 80,553 votes (63.06%) to 47,192 (36.94%), making him the first Republican to represent the 1st district in over a century. This was not considered an upset, as the 1st has always been a rather conservative district (especially in the Memphis suburbs). The district had only supported the Democratic nominee for president once since 1956, when Jimmy Carter carried the district in 1976. Although Whitten had a nearly unbreakable hold on the district, it had been considered very likely that he would be succeeded by a Republican once he retired.

Wicker was reelected six times without serious difficulty, never receiving less than 65% of the vote. In 2004, he was unopposed by a Democratic candidate, facing only Reform Party nominee Barbara Dale Washer, whom he defeated by 219,328 votes (79.01%) to 58,256 (20.99%).

Tenure
Assuming office in 1995, Wicker was president of the freshman class, which included 53 other new Republican representatives, elected as part of the 1994 "Republican Revolution".

Wicker was a member of the House Appropriations Committee. He was also deputy Republican whip.

In Congress, Wicker worked on issues related to medical research and on economic development for his home state. He advocated private-public partnerships to bring investment to rural areas. Wicker also worked for veterans' issues while serving as a member of the Military Construction and Veterans Affairs Subcommittee. In his final year as representative, Wicker topped the list in earmarks.

In 2007, Wicker was criticized after securing a $6 million earmark for a defense company whose executives had made significant contributions to his campaign.

U.S. Senate

Committee assignments, 117th Congress
 Senate Committee on Armed Services
 Subcommittee on Airland
 Subcommittee on Personnel
 Subcommittee on Seapower
 Senate Committee on Commerce, Science and Transportation
 Subcommittee on Aviation Operations, Safety, and Security
 Subcommittee on Communications, Technology, and the Internet (Chair)
 Subcommittee on Oceans, Atmosphere, Fisheries, and Coast Guard
 Subcommittee on Surface Transportation and Merchant Marine Infrastructure, Safety and Security
 Senate Committee on Environment and Public Works
 Subcommittee on Clean Air and Nuclear Safety
 Subcommittee on Green Jobs and the New Economy
 Subcommittee on Superfund, Toxics and Environmental Health
 Subcommittee on Transportation and Infrastructure
 United States Senate Committee on Rules and Administration
 Commission on Security and Cooperation in Europe

Caucus memberships
 Congressional Human Rights Caucus
 Congressional Immigration Reform Caucus
 International Conservation Caucus
 Interstate 69 Caucus (Co-Chair)
 Sportsmen's Caucus
 Tennessee Valley Authority Congressional Caucus

Appointment
On November 26, 2007, Senator Trent Lott announced that he would resign before the end of the year to become a lobbyist. At a press conference on December 31, 2007, Mississippi Governor Haley Barbour appointed Wicker to fill the Senate seat Lott vacated on December 18, 2007. He was sworn in by the Senate clerk just before that news conference.

Elections
2008

Wicker ran for the remainder of Lott's term in the November 2008 special election against Democrat Ronnie Musgrove, Barbour's predecessor as governor. Wicker defeated Musgrove, 683,409 votes (54.96%) to 560,064 (45.04%). Wicker's resignation from the House also triggered a May 13, 2008, special election to fill the vacancy in the House, which was won by Democratic nominee Travis Childers.

2012

Wicker ran for reelection to a full term in 2012. He was opposed by Robert Maloney and Tea Party activist E. Allen Hathcock in the Republican primary, defeating them by 254,936 votes (89.17%) to 18,857 (6.60%) and 12,106 (4.23%), respectively. In the general election, he defeated Albert Gore, the Chairman of the Oktibbeha County Democratic Party and a distant relative of former Vice President Al Gore, 709,626 votes (57.16%) to 503,467 (40.55%).

Tenure

On September 16, 2010, President Barack Obama announced his intent to nominate Wicker as representative of the United States to the Sixty-fifth Session of the General Assembly of the United Nations.

In the Senate, Wicker is a member of the Senate Republicans' whip team and has repeatedly introduced a bill to overturn Roe v. Wade, the Supreme Court decision ruling abortion bans unconstitutional. Wicker called the Affordable Care Act the "great fight for the rest of this term, maybe our lifetimes" and later introduced a bill to enable state officials to challenge the law. In the interest of protecting gun owners, he amended a fiscal 2010 transportation spending bill to allow Amtrak passengers to carry firearms and ammunition in checked baggage.

Wicker and Representative Gene Taylor pushed amendments allowing purchasers of federal flood insurance to add wind coverage to their policies, helpful to a hurricane-prone state. As a member of the Commission on Security and Cooperation in Europe (Helsinki Commission) monitoring human rights and other issues, in late 2012 Wicker worked with Senator Ben Cardin to enact a bill imposing penalties on Russians accused of violating human rights. The measure led Russian President Vladimir Putin to announce a subsequent ban on U.S. adoptions of Russian-born children.

Wicker was one of three politicians targeted during the April 2013 ricin letters bioterrorism attack. On April 16, 2013, a letter addressed to Wicker tested positive for the poison ricin as part of a series of letters. The letter was detected by postal officials and law enforcement and prevented from reaching the Capitol. The letter was tested three times, with each test confirming the presence of ricin.

In July 2013, Wicker proposed that the Senate meet to discuss a controversial change to filibuster rules. The Senate held the private meeting in the Old Senate chamber to discuss Senate Majority Leader Harry Reid's threat of the so-called "nuclear option", which would change the rules for Senate votes on Obama's executive branch nominees. Wicker said he hoped the chamber's bipartisan past could serve as an inspiration for the debate about the nuclear option: "I think there are concessions that can be made on both sides. And then I would just hope that, institutionally, we can get away from this mindset."

Wicker supported the Bipartisan Sportsmen's Act of 2014 (S. 2363; 113th Congress), a bill related to hunting, fishing, and outdoor recreation, aimed at improving "the public's ability to enjoy the outdoors." He said, "Mississippians know the importance of efforts to preserve our natural resources for future generations."

Wicker was elected chair of the National Republican Senatorial Committee for the 114th U.S. Congress on November 13, 2014.

Weeks after the 2014 Hong Kong class boycott campaign and Umbrella Movement broke out, demanding genuine universal suffrage among other goals, Wicker joined Senator Sherrod Brown and Representative Chris Smith's effort to introduce the Hong Kong Human Rights and Democracy Act, which would update the United States–Hong Kong Policy Act of 1992 and U.S. commitment to Hong Kong's freedom and democracy. "U.S. should stand steadfast with the people of Hong Kong in their fight to exercise self-determination," Wicker said, and "speak with a unified American voice in support of universal freedom and democratic values. The Congress and the Obama Administration should act to ensure China honors its longstanding obligation under international law to maintain Hong Kong's autonomy."

In March 2017, Wicker co-sponsored the Israel Anti-Boycott Act (s. 720), which made it a federal crime for Americans to encourage or participate in boycotts against Israel and Israeli settlements in the West Bank if protesting actions by the Israeli government.

In May 2020, a group of Senate Republicans planned to introduce a privacy bill that would regulate the data collected by coronavirus contact tracing apps. The COVID-19 Consumer Data Protection Act would "provide all Americans with more transparency, choice, and control over the collection and use of their personal health, geolocation, and proximity data", according to a joint statement. Wicker said the legislation also would "hold businesses accountable to consumers if they use personal data to fight the COVID-19 pandemic." The act would permit the creation of "platforms that could trace the virus and help flatten the curve and stop the spread – and maintaining privacy protections for U.S. citizens", Wicker said.

In September 2020, less than two months before the next presidential election, Wicker supported an immediate Senate vote on Trump's nominee to fill the Supreme Court vacancy caused by Justice Ruth Bader Ginsburg's death, saying that Senate Republicans had "promised to confirm well qualified, conservative judges" and that there was a "constitutional duty" to fill vacancies. In March 2016, Wicker had taken the opposite position by declining to consider Obama's Supreme Court nominee during a presidential election year, saying that the "American people should have the opportunity to make their voices heard before filling a lifetime appointment to the nation’s highest court."

Wicker announced before the 2021 United States Electoral College vote count that he would vote to certify the election on January 6, 2021. He was participating in the certification when Trump supporters attacked the U.S. Capitol. When the Capitol was secure and Congress returned to complete the certification, Wicker voted to certify the count, with his senate counterpart, Cindy Hyde-Smith objecting to the count. In the wake of the violence and certification, Wicker called for perpetrators to be prosecuted "to the fullest extent of the law" and said, "we must work together to rebuild confidence in our institutions." Wicker opposed Trump's removal from office, encouraging a peaceful transfer of power on Inauguration Day.

In March 2021, after Congress passed the American Rescue Plan Act of 2021, Wicker highlighted on social media that the bill awarded $28.6 billion of "targeted relief" to "independent restaurant operators" to "survive the pandemic". In that post, he neglected to mention that he had voted against the bill.

In August 2021, Wicker voted for the Infrastructure Investment and Jobs Act.

After President Joe Biden said that he planned to select a black woman to appoint to the Supreme Court in January 2022, Wicker told Mississippi radio host Paul Gallo that the nominee would be a "beneficiary" of an affirmative action "quota", drawing a rebuke from the White House.

Political positions
The Heritage Foundation gave Wicker a lifetime conservative rating of 61% (the average Republican scored 79%). As of December 2017, Wicker ranks 14th of 98 in the Bipartisan Index compiled by The Lugar Center, which reflects a low level of partisanship.

Foreign policy 
Wicker supported the Iraq War and called it just. As a U.S. representative, Wicker believed it was necessary to remove Saddam Hussein from power. Experts have said the Iraq War cost the U.S. over $3 trillion.

Wicker supported the U.S. Invasion of Afghanistan and called withdrawing "one of the biggest foreign policy catastrophes in my lifetime.” He also said, "we were better off with a Korea-like presence". Afterward, he cosponsored legislation that would have ended official diplomatic relations with Afghanistan. The U.S. War in Afghanistan has cost American taxpayers an estimated $2.3 trillion.

In December 2021, Wicker threatened a preemptive nuclear strike against Russia, saying: "we don't rule out first-use nuclear action." He issued this threat two months before the Russian invasion of Ukraine began. Wicker also supported implementing a no-fly zone over Ukraine in 2022, which National Review called "a very bad idea".

Wicker is an ardent Zionist and one of the most pro-Israel U.S. politicians. According to the American Jewish Congress, he "opposed the Iran Deal and opposed UN Security Resolution 2334", which affirmed that Israel’s settlement activity violated international law. Wicker also voted for the Israel Anti-Boycott Act, supported the Anti-Semitism Awareness Act, and cosponsored the United States-Israel Security Authorization Act of 2018, which allocated military funding for Israel regardless of the Palestinian question. He opposed opening a U.S. Palestinian consulate in East Jerusalem, which would have answered to the U.S. Department of State.

2023 omnibus appropriations bill 
Wicker was one of 18 Republican senators to vote for the $1.7 trillion omnibus bill that former President Donald Trump heavily criticized. The bill prohibited the construction of new immigration barriers and did not increase border enforcement spending past current inflation levels. Wicker also voted to send $45 billion more to Ukraine.

Refugees 
Wicker strongly supports expanding U.S. visas for Ukrainian refugees. He previously opposed Mississippi accepting Syrian refugees who fled from war-torn Syria.

Ukraine 
Wicker has been one of Ukraine's strongest Republican supporters. He voted each time to increase aid to Ukraine. In a press release, Wicker wrote: "President Reagan once called the Soviet Union 'the focus of evil in the modern world.' After two months of unprovoked brutality, it is obvious that the Kremlin remains one of the chief forces for evil in our world."

Federal spending 
Wicker identifies as a fiscal conservative but has consistently voted to increase federal spending for agriculture, infrastructure, and military projects throughout Mississippi.

Mississippi flag 
Since 2015, Wicker has sought to change the Mississippi flag, calling it offensive to many of his "fellow citizens". 64% of Mississippians voted to keep the flag in a 2001 referendum. Wicker supported nullifying that vote in 2020 and replacing the flag without a new referendum.

Confederacy 
While discussing Mississippi's previous state flag, Wicker said his Confederate military ancestors were "Americans" and "brave".

Climate change
In 2015, Wicker was the only U.S. senator to vote against an amendment declaring that climate change is real. The final vote was 98 to 1, with Senator Harry Reid, the Democratic leader from Nevada, not voting. The amendment affirmed that "climate change is real and not a hoax."

In 2017, Wicker was one of 22 senators to sign a letter to President Trump urging him to withdraw the United States from the Paris Agreement. According to OpenSecrets, Wicker has received over $200,000 from the oil and gas industry since 2012.

Gun law
Wicker's support for pro-gun legislation and gun rights has earned him an A+ rating from the National Rifle Association (NRA). The NRA endorsed Wicker during the 2012 election. Wicker has said that he will filibuster any bill that he feels "infringes" on the Second Amendment, including weapon bans. He has received $21,350 in funding from gun lobbyists for his political activities.

In 2009, Wicker introduced a bill allowing Amtrak passengers to check unloaded and locked handguns in their luggage. The law passed 68–30. His rationale for the bill was that people's Second Amendment rights were violated on a federally subsidized train system if they could not bring their guns.

One day after the 2015 San Bernardino attack, Wicker voted against a bill, co-sponsored by a Democrat and a Republican, that would make background checks mandatory when a person buys a gun. He said he voted against it because he feared it would have "opened the door to a national gun registry."

In 2017, Wicker voted in favor of "a joint resolution of disapproval aimed at former President Obama's executive action requiring the Social Security Administration (SSA) place beneficiaries on the National Instant Criminal Background Check System 'mental defective' list."

Secularism
Wicker asked the United States Navy to deny the admission of a secular humanist to the Chaplain Corps, saying, "It is troubling that the Navy could allow a self-avowed atheist to serve in the Chaplain Corps."

January 6 commission
On May 28, 2021, Wicker voted against creating an independent commission to investigate the January 6 United States Capitol attack.

Political ratings
In 2020, Wicker received a score of 74 from the American Conservative Union. He has a lifetime rating of 83.62. The Americans for Democratic Action gave Wicker a score of 0 for the term.

Electoral history

The following is a partial summary of Wicker's election results.

Personal life
Wicker has consistently ranked amongst the poorest members of Congress, with a 2018 net worth of -$180,996. The Clarion Ledger ranked Wicker as the poorest federal politician from Mississippi in 2014, with a negative net worth of minus $200,000. Wicker earns an annual Senate salary of $174,000; it is unclear why he has a negative net worth.

Wicker has been married to Gayle Long since 1975. They have three children and six grandchildren. The Wickers reside in Tupelo, where Wicker is a deacon and a member of the First Baptist Church Tupelo choir.

References

Works cited

External links

 Senator Roger Wicker official U.S. Senate website
 Roger Wicker for Senate
 
 
 

|-

|-

|-

|-

|-

|-

|-

|-

|-

1951 births
20th-century American military personnel
21st-century American politicians
American military lawyers
Baptists from Mississippi
United States Air Force Judge Advocate General's Corps
Living people
Military personnel from Mississippi
Mississippi lawyers
Republican Party Mississippi state senators
People from Pontotoc, Mississippi
Politicians from Tupelo, Mississippi
Republican Party members of the United States House of Representatives from Mississippi
Republican Party United States senators from Mississippi
Southern Baptists
United States Air Force officers
United States Air Force reservists
University of Mississippi School of Law alumni
Conservatism in the United States
Baptists from the United States